Akalgarh may refer to:

 Akalgarh, Ludhiana, Ludhiana district, Punjab, India
 Akalgarh, Phagwara, Kapurthala district, Punjab, India
 Akalgarh, Pakistan